From the North may refer to:

Music

From the North (Raised Fist album)
"From the North", song by Roger Whittaker from Celebration (Roger Whittaker album) 1993
"From the North", song by Paul Mounsey and Runrig